Lucile Tessariol (born 6 January 2004) is a French swimmer. She competed in the women's 4 × 200 metre freestyle relay at the 2020 European Aquatics Championships and in the women's 4 × 200 metre freestyle relay at the 2020 Summer Olympics. with the French team finishing fourth and eighth respectively.

References

External links
 

2004 births
Living people
French female freestyle swimmers
Olympic swimmers of France
Swimmers at the 2020 Summer Olympics
Mediterranean Games medalists in swimming
Mediterranean Games silver medalists for France
Swimmers at the 2022 Mediterranean Games
Place of birth missing (living people)
21st-century French women
European Aquatics Championships medalists in swimming